Sir Henry Billingsley (died 22 November 1606) was an English merchant, Lord Mayor of London and the first translator of Euclid into English.

Early life
He was a son of Sir William Billingsley, haberdasher and assay master of London, and his wife, Elizabeth Harlowe. He entered St. John's College, Cambridge, in 1551, and also studied at Oxford, where, under the tutelage of David Whytehead, he developed an interest in mathematics. His father died in 1553, and in the next year, his mother remarried to Sir Martin Bowes. He did not take a degree but was apprenticed to a London merchant. He became a freeman of the Worshipful Company of Haberdashers by patrimony in 1560.

Career

Billingsley prospered as a merchant. He was chosen sheriff of London in 1584 and alderman of Tower Ward in 1585. He became one of Elizabeth's four customs collectors in 1589. In 1596, he succeeded Sir Thomas Skinner as Lord Mayor of London, and was knighted in the following year.

In 1603, he sat in Parliament for London. He founded three scholarships for poor students at St. John's College and served as President of St Thomas' Hospital. Although in the introduction to his Euclid, he proposed to undertake other translations, he never did so.

Translation of Euclid

In 1570, Billingsley published his translation of Euclid's Elements The elements of geometrie of the most ancient philosopher Euclide of Megara. (Actually, it should have been Euclid of Alexandria; the two Euclids were frequently confused in the Renaissance.) The work included a lengthy preface by John Dee, which surveyed all the existing branches of pure and applied mathematics. Dee also provided copious notes and other supplementary material. The work was printed in folio by John Day, and included several three-dimensional fold-up diagrams illustrating solid geometry. Though not the very first, it was one of the first books to include such a feature.

The translation, renowned for its clarity and accuracy, was made from Greek rather than the well-known Latin translation of Campanus. Augustus De Morgan has suggested that the translation was solely the work of Dee, but in his correspondence, Dee states specifically that only the introduction and the supplementary material were his. Anthony Wood asserted that the translation was largely the work of Whytehead, who spent his final years at Billingsley's house. This story passed from Robert Barnes in Oxford to Thomas Allen; and from Allen to Brian Twyne.

Whytehead did apparently provide some assistance, but there is no evidence that the work is all his; Wood frequently reported gossip as fact. Billingsley's copy of Euclid found its way to Princeton College and Halsted described it, putting to rest the claims that the translation had been made from the Latin and that it was not Billingsley's own work.

Family
By the remarriages of his mother after his father's death, Henry Billingsley became the stepson successively of Sir Martin Bowes (died 1567), and then of Thomas Seckford, Esquire (died 1587). His mother died in 1586.

He married five times and had at least ten children. The majority of his children were born to his first marriage to Elizabeth Bourne (died July 1577). His third wife Katherine Killigrew (died 1598) came from the prominent Cornish family whose seat was at Arwenack near Falmouth.

He purchased, with his son Henry, Siston Court, Gloucestershire c.1598 from Arthur Player of Westerleigh, who had acquired it in 1595. His daughter Elizabeth married the cloth merchant, Sir John Quarles (not to be confused with the later poet John Quarles).

References

Bibliography
 
 Diana M. Simpkins "Early editions of Euclid in England", Annals of Science, Volume 22, Number 4, December 1966.
 George Bruce Halsted, "Note on the First English Euclid", American Journal of Mathematics, Vol. 2, No. 1. (Mar., 1879), pp. 46–48.

External links
 Several pictures of a copy of Billingsley's Euclid
 

16th-century births
Year of birth unknown
1606 deaths
English merchants
Greek–English translators
16th-century English translators
Sheriffs of the City of London
16th-century lord mayors of London
English MPs 1604–1611
Members of the Parliament of England for the City of London
Alumni of St John's College, Cambridge